Band-e Yaghmur (also Romanized as Band-e Yaghmūr and Band-e Yaqmūr) is a village in Garmkhan Rural District, Garmkhan District, Bojnord County, North Khorasan Province, Iran. At the 2006 census, its population was 520, in 117 families.

References 

Populated places in Bojnord County